Frank C. Zummo is an American musician, best known as the drummer for rock bands Sum 41 and Street Drum Corps.

Career
Zummo is one of the founding members of Street Drum Corps.

Zummo has performed as the drummer for several other bands, both as a full-time member and session member. including Thenewno2, theStart, Dead By Sunrise and Krewella.
In August 2009, Zummo filled in for Tommy Lee for a string of Mötley Crüe shows. In January 2011, he became the new drummer for the band Julien-K.

Zummo joined Sum 41 in 2015, following the departure of original drummer and founding member  Steve Jocz in 2013. To date, Zummo has recorded two albums with Sum 41, 2016's 13 Voices and 2019's Order in Decline.

Zummo has performed drum sets and DJ sets several times at Emo Nite in Los Angeles.

Discography 
With Street Drum Corps
 Street Drum Corps (2006)
 We Are Machines (2008)
 Big Noise (2010)
 Children of the Drum (2012)

With Sum 41
 13 Voices (2016)
 Order in Decline (2019)
 Heaven and Hell (TBA)

As a featured artist
 Titus – "Wasted Youth"
 Virtual Riot & Modestep - "This Could Be Us"
 Ray Volpe - "Afterlife (I'll Dream of You)"

Awards and nominations

Awards
A select list of Zummo's awards and nominations.

|-
| 2017 || "Frank Zummo" || Alternative Press Music Awards – Best Drummer ||

References

External links

American punk rock drummers
Punk rock drummers
Living people
Sum 41 members
Dead by Sunrise members
Julien-K members
Year of birth missing (living people)